Jon Courtenay (born 4 March 1973) is an English singer, pianist, entertainer and comedian, known for winning the fourteenth series of Britain's Got Talent, having previously been awarded the golden buzzer during his audition by presenters Ant & Dec. He was the first ever Golden Buzzer act to win in the history of the show.

Jonathan has two sons, Nathan and Alfie. Aged 17 and 11. Nathan was born 23rd March 2005, Alfie was born 23rd June 2011.

During filming BGT in July 2020, a suspicious mole on the left side of his head was found to be a melanoma. This wasn't talked about on the show so as not to become the narrative, and after treatment he was given the all-clear by the end of that year. It was then discovered that the cancer had spread to his neck which required major surgery and a course of treatment. This experience inspired a new show 'Against The Odds', a one-man comedy musical that he took to the Edinburgh Fringe in 2022. 

He is from Mossley, Greater Manchester.

Appearances

Television

Tours

References

External links 
 Official site
 Article in Evening Chronicle
 Article in Ipswich Star
 
 
 

1973 births
Britain's Got Talent winners
British male pianists
English entertainers
English male comedians
Living people
Place of birth missing (living people)